The 2011 If Stockholm Open was a professional tennis tournament played on indoor hard courts. It was the 43rd edition of the tournament, which was part of the 2011 ATP World Tour. It took place at the Kungliga tennishallen in Stockholm, Sweden between 17 and 23 October 2011.

Finals

Singles

 Gaël Monfils defeated  Jarkko Nieminen, 7–5, 3–6, 6–2 
It was Monfils' 1st title of the year and 4th of his career.

Doubles

 Rohan Bopanna /  Aisam-ul-Haq Qureshi defeated  Marcelo Melo /  Bruno Soares, 6–1, 6–3

ATP entrants

Seeds

 1 Rankings are as of October 10, 2011.

Other entrants
The following players received wildcards into the singles main draw:
  Tommy Haas
  Michael Ryderstedt
  Bernard Tomic

The following players received entry from the qualifying draw:

  Marius Copil
  Tobias Kamke
  Sebastian Rieschick
  Jürgen Zopp

References

External links
 Official website 

 
If Stockholm Open
Stockholm Open
If Stockholm Open
2010s in Stockholm
2011 in Swedish tennis